North Hill Historic District may refer to:

North Hill Historic District (Mingo Junction, Ohio), listed on the National Register of Historic Places (NRHP) in Jefferson County, Ohio
North Hill Historic District (New Castle, Pennsylvania), listed on the NRHP

See also
North Hill Preservation District, Pensacola, Florida, listed on the NRHP